Season two of Mira quién baila premiered on Univision on September 11, 2011 and ended on November 20, 2011. The TV series is the Spanish version of British version Strictly Come Dancing and American Version Dancing with the Stars (U.S. TV series). Ten celebrities are paired with ten professional ballroom dancers. Javier Posa and Chiquinquirá Delgado are the hosts for this season. Adamari López won 1st place, while Priscila Angel won 2nd place, and Erik Estrada in 3rd place.

Judges

The Celebrities

Scores 

Red numbers indicate the lowest score for each week.
Green numbers indicate the highest score for each week.
 indicates the couple eliminated that week.
 indicates the couple withdrew from the competition.
 indicates the couple that was safe but withdrew from the competition.
 indicates the winning couple.
 indicates the runner-up couple.
 indicates the third-place couple.

Call-Out Order

Week 1–2 were duel weeks, with no actual eliminations.
Week 9, all celebrities were immune from elimination, making them go to semi-finals automatically.

Averages 
This table only counts dances scored on the traditional 30-point scale.

 RBN/D: Rank by Number of Dances/Nominations
 NOD: Number of Dances
 NOM: Number of Nominations

References

External links
 Official website of Mira Quien Baila
 

2011 American television seasons